Aces of ANSI Art (abbreviated as ) was the first group of artists specifically organized for the purposes of creating and distributing ANSI art.  The group was founded and operated by two BBS enthusiasts from California, "Zyphril" and "Chips Ahoy", from 1989 through 1991.

History
The group was initially formed in 1989 during the BBS era, but soon after the group's founding, ANSI art groups took on a life of their own, growing increasingly popular and spawning what would come to be known as the "artscene."  ANSI art, which initially began as a method for bulletin board sysops to draw users to their boards, but with the emergence of organized groups, the artscene became associated with "underground" culture, such as warez boards.

In 1990, a schism occurred when a small but influential group of members left the group to form ACiD Productions.  ACiD (ANSI Creators In Demand) grew to become the first international artscene group.

Membership

 Chips Ahoy (Founder)
 Zyphril (Founder)
 RaD Man (Senior member)
 Mondoman
 The Beholder
 Icepirate

See also

 ANSI art
 ASCII art
 Demoscene
 Digital art
 List of artscene groups
 Pixel art
 Software art

Further reading
 Danet, Brenda.  "Cyberpl@y: Communicating Online".  Oxford, UK: Berg Publishers, 2001.  .
 "Dark Domain: the artpacks.acid.org collection" (DVD-ROM).  San Jose, CA, USA: ACiD Productions, LLC, 2004.  .
 Hacker Chronicles, CD-Rom, produced and distributed by P-80 Systems.
 Scott, Jason.  "BBS: The Documentary" (DVD).  Boston, MA, USA: Bovine Ignition Systems, 2005.
 Wands, Bruce (2006). Art of the Digital Age, London: Thames & Hudson. .
 Zetter, Kim.  "How Humble BBS Begat Wired World".  Wired News.  June 8, 2005.  Retrieved October 27, 2005.

References

External links

Examples of ANSI Artwork
 Aces of ANSI Art Classics, a YouTube video featuring Animations from 1991 by Members of the AAA
 artscene.textfiles.com, The artscene branch of the textfiles.com library.
 darkdomain.org, Dark Domain (2004).  An archive on DVD which hosts a complete collection of underground artscene works between 1987 and 2003.
 Roy/SAC Text Artist- Superior Art Creations, Information about ASCII Art Styles, SAC Art Packs Download
Sixteen Colors ANSI Art and ASCII Art Archive - A web viewable archive of current and past ANSI and ASCII packs released by the computer art scene

More on the History of the Art Scene
 BBS: The Documentary Episode 5 documents the rise of the Art Scene

Releases
 Aces of ANSI Art Remembrance Pack - An archive of ANSI artwork created by various members of the group between 1989 and 1991.

1989 establishments in the United States
Artscene groups
ASCII art
Bulletin board systems
Demogroups